Ida LaFontaine (born 19 May 1997) is a Swedish pop singer, songwriter and dancer. She started singing at the age of 10 when she sang on Måns Zelmerlöw's track "Hold on". She also participated in Lilla Melodifestivalen in 2011. In 2012, she was contracted by  Warner Music and in September of the same year her first music single "Dancing 4 my Life" was released. On 7 August 2014, she released the single "Anthem".

In late 2014, Ida LaFontaine was contacted by Universal and Polydor which signed her up as a new recording singer. Her first music single with her label was "Shut Up And Kiss Me”.

Discography

Singles

As lead artist

Promotional singles

References

External links 

Living people
1997 births
Swedish pop singers
Swedish singer-songwriters
Swedish female dancers
English-language singers from Sweden
People from Sollentuna Municipality
21st-century Swedish singers